George Mackay (6 July 1860 – 22 May 1948) was an Australian cricketer. He played six first-class cricket matches for Victoria between 1880 and 1884.

See also
 List of Victoria first-class cricketers

References

External links
 

1860 births
1948 deaths
Australian cricketers
Victoria cricketers
People from Castlemaine, Victoria